Khalifa Hassan Ali (born 1946) is a Bahraini actor, director, and writer, conside red one of the pioneers of theatre in Bahrain. He helped found many institutions, including the Bahrain Writers’ Association, the Awal Theater, and the Bahrain National Cultural Forum. He also wrote short stories and novels, in addition to stage and television screenplays, and he directed extensively.

Short stories

Direction

Radio series
 جري الوحوش (“Running Monsters”)
 ملاذ الطير (“Malath al-Tair)
 الوهم (“Illusion”)

TV series

External links
 El Cinema page

References

Arab film directors
Bahraini writers
Bahraini male actors	
1946 births
Living people